Umsweswe is a village in the province of Mashonaland West, Zimbabwe. It is located about 16 km south-west of Kadoma.

Populated places in Mashonaland West Province